8TV was a Polish television channel, launched on 28 September 2016. On June 16, 2017, the channel was replaced with Eska TV.

References

External links
 Official site 

Defunct television channels in Poland
Television channels and stations established in 2016
Television channels and stations disestablished in 2017
2016 establishments in Poland
2017 disestablishments in Poland